Madan Rai was the penultimate chief minister of medieval Sylhet's Gour Kingdom. He was described to have been very sharp and "shrewd".

Office
Appointed as Chief Minister of Gour, Madan Rai was stationed on a hillock (now known as Mona Rai's Tilla) near the port for ease in tax collection and civil duties.

The long-lasted conflict between Gour Kingdom and Brahmachal, ruled by Raja Upananda, continued to trouble the land. Govardhan appointed Madan Rai to somehow find a way to lure Upananda's general, Amar Singh, in order to use him in infiltrating Brahmachal. Govardhan and Madan Rai then made an agreement with Govardhan's general Virabhadra to give his daughter, Chandra Kala, in marriage to Singh. Despite protests, the marriage was successful and Singh maintained a good relationship with General Virabhadra. Singh was able to persuade the Kuki Chiefs, the border guards for the Tripura Kingdom just south of Brahmachal into raiding Raja Upananda's palace in the dead of the night. The plan was successful; the Kukis massacred most of the palace's inmates. A battle emerged leading to the death of Raja Upananda. General Amar Singh took over Brahmachal for a short while before also being killed. Eventually, the Kuki Chiefs managed to annex Brahmachal (centred in modern-day Baramchal in Kulaura) to the King of Tripura and Govardhan sent Jaidev Rai, son of Upananda's minister, to be a feudal ruler under the Tripuras.

His office ended in 1260 with the death of Raja Govardhan and ascension of Raja Gour Govinda to the throne. Govinda appointed Mona Rai as his minister, dismissing Madan Rai.

References

Rulers of Sylhet
13th-century Indian people
13th-century rulers in Asia
Indian Hindus